Deh-e Ali Khan (also Romanized as Deh-e ‘Alī Khān) is a village in Margan Rural District, in the Central District of Hirmand County, Sistan and Baluchestan Province, Iran. At the 2006 census, its population was 25, in 6 families.

References 

Populated places in Hirmand County